Toll-like receptor 8 is a protein that in humans is encoded by the TLR8 gene. TLR8 has also been designated as CD288 (cluster of differentiation 288). It is a member of the toll-like receptor (TLR) family.

Function 

TLR8 seems to function differently in humans and mice.  Until recently, TLR8 was believed to be nonfunctional in mice, but it seems to counteract TLR7 activity

The TLR family plays a fundamental role in pathogen recognition and activation of innate immunity. TLRs are highly conserved from Drosophila to humans and share structural and functional similarities. They recognize pathogen-associated molecular patterns (PAMPs) that are expressed on infectious agents, and mediate the production of cytokines necessary for the development of effective immunity. The various TLRs exhibit different patterns of expression. This gene is predominantly expressed in lung and peripheral blood leukocytes, and lies in close proximity to another family member, TLR7, on chromosome X. Recent research has also shown the expression of TLR8 in hippocampal interneurons, with yet unknown function. 

TLR8 can recognize GU-rich single-stranded RNA. However, the presence of GU-rich sequences in the single-stranded RNA is not sufficient to stimulate TLR8. TLR8 recognizes G-rich oligonucleotides.

TLR8 is an endosomal receptor that recognizes single stranded RNA (ssRNA), and can recognize ssRNA viruses such as Influenza, Sendai, and Coxsackie B viruses. TLR8 binding to the viral RNA recruits MyD88 and leads to activation of the transcription factor NF-κB and an antiviral response. TLR8 recognizes single-stranded RNA of viruses such as HIV and HCV.

Clinical significance
Genetic variants in TLR8 has recently been linked to susceptibility to pulmonary tuberculosis.

As a drug target
 TLR8 agonists (e.g. VTX-2337) have undergone clinical trials as immune stimulants in combination therapy for some cancers.

 TLR8 antagonists (e.g. CU-CPT9a) may have therapeutic applications against autoimmune disorders.

References

Further reading

External links 
 
 PDBe-KB provides an overview of all the structure information available in the PDB for Human Toll-like receptor 8 (TLR8)

8
Clusters of differentiation